Sungbo's Eredo is a system of defensive walls and ditches that is located to the southwest of the Yoruba town of Ijebu Ode in Ogun State, southwest Nigeria. It was built in 800–1000 AD in honour of the Ijebu noblewoman Oloye Bilikisu Sungbo. The location is on Nigeria's tentative list of potential UNESCO World Heritage Sites.

Description
The fortifications consist of a ditch with unusually smooth walls and a bank in the inner side of ditch. The height difference between the bottom of the ditch and the upper rim of the bank on the inner side can reach . Works have been performed in laterite, a typical African soil consisting of clay and iron oxides.

Myths
Legends of the contemporary Ijebu clan link the Eredo to a fabled wealthy and childless widow named Bilikisu Sungbo. According to them, the monument was built as her personal memorial. In addition to this, her grave is believed to be located in Oke-Eiri, a town in a Muslim area just north of the Eredo. Pilgrims of Christian, Muslim and traditional African religions annually trek to this holy site in tribute to her.

Some have connected Bilikisu Sungbo with the legend of the Queen of Sheba, a figure who is mentioned in both the Bible and Quran. In the Hebrew Bible, she is described as having sent a caravan of gold, ivory and other goods from her kingdom to Solomon. In the Quran she is an Ethiopian sun-worshipper involved in the incense trade who converts to Islam; commentators added that her name was "Bilqis".

After excavations in 1999 the archaeologist Patrick Darling was quoted as saying, "I don't want to overplay the Sheba theory, but it cannot be discounted ... The local people believe it and that's what is important ... The most cogent argument against it at the moment is the dating."

History
The archaeology of Sungbo's Eredo points to the presence of a large polity in the area before the opening of the Trans-Atlantic trade.

The Eredo served a defensive purpose when it was built in 800–1000 AD, a period of political confrontation and consolidation in the southern Nigerian rainforest. It was likely to have been inspired by the same process that led to the construction of similar walls and ditches throughout western Nigeria, including earthworks around Ifẹ̀, Ilesa, and the Benin Iya, a  series of connected but separate earthworks in the neighboring Edo-speaking region. It is believed that the Eredo was a means of unifying an area of diverse communities into a single kingdom. It seems that the builders of these fortifications deliberately tried to reach groundwater or clay to create a swampy bottom for the ditch. If this could be achieved in shallow depth, builders stopped, even if only at the depth of 1 meter. In some places small, conical idol statues had been placed on the bottom of the ditch.

Modern times
The impressive size and complex construction of the Eredo drew worldwide media attention in September 1999 when Dr Patrick Darling, a British archaeologist then with Bournemouth University, surveyed the site and began publicizing his bid to preserve the Eredo and bring the site some prominence. Previously, the Eredo had been little-known outside of the small community of residents and specialists in Yoruba history. Forty years passed between Professor Peter Lloyd's publication of his analysis of the site and that of Darling, but it still served to necessitate a complete rethinking of West Africa's past. In 2017, technologist Olufeko led a freelance team inside the rampart bringing the location and its narrative back into social dialogue.

See also
Walls of Benin
Olumo Rock
Lekki Conservation Centre

References

Other sources
 P.C. Lloyd, "Sungbo's Eredo," Odu, 7 (1959), 15–22.
 Onishi, Norimitsu; "A Wall, a Moat, Behold! A Lost Yoruba Kingdom," The New York Times, September 26, 1999.

External links
African Legacy
Nigeria's hidden wonder
African Legacy
Sungbo's Eredo, Southern Nigeria
The Lost World of Nigeria, on WorldHum.com	
Wondermondo - Sungbo's Eredo

Fortifications in Africa
Walls
Archaeological sites in Nigeria
Yoruba history
Historic buildings and structures in Nigeria
Yoruba architecture
Linear earthworks
Archaeological sites of Western Africa